A league (  ayimaγ  Aimag; historically,  čiγulγan  Qûûlgan) is an administrative unit of the autonomous region of Inner Mongolia in the People's Republic of China.

Leagues are the prefectures of Inner Mongolia. The name comes from a Mongolian administrative unit used during the Qing dynasty in Mongolia. Mongolian Banners (county level regions) were organized into conventional assemblies at the league level. During the ROC era, the leagues had a status equivalent to provinces. Leagues contain banners, equivalent to counties.

After the establishment of the provincial level Inner Mongolia Autonomous Region in 1947, leagues of Inner Mongolia became equal to prefectures in other provinces and autonomous regions. The administrative commission of the league is the administrative branch office dispatched by the People's Government of Inner Mongolia Autonomous Region. The leader of the league's government, titled as league leader, is appointed by People's Government of Inner Mongolia Autonomous Region. So are deputy leaders of leagues. Instead of local level of People's Congress, league's working commissions of the Standing Committee of the People’s Congress of Inner Mongolia Autonomous Region are detached and supervise the league's governments, but can not elect or dismiss league's government officials. In such a way, the league's working committee of the Inner Mongolia Autonomous Region's committee of the Chinese People's Political Consultative Conference is instead of league's committee of CPPCC.

Leagues have existed since the Qing dynasty as a level of government. The head of a league was chosen from jasagh or sula of the banners belonging to it. The original six leagues were Jirem, Ju Ud, Jost, Xilingol, Ulanqab, and Ih Ju. More were added in the subsequent centuries.

Today, leagues belong to the prefecture level of the Chinese administrative hierarchy. Of the 9 leagues that existed in the late 1970s, 6 have now been reorganized into prefecture-level cities. There are only 3 leagues remaining in Inner Mongolia: Xilingol, Alxa, and Hinggan.

Leagues (1949–present)

Current

Defunct

Original leagues of the Qing

The 6 leagues under Inner Mongolia

Other league

Changes

References

See also
 Administrative divisions of Mongolia during Qing
 Administrative divisions of the People's Republic of China
 Prefecture of China
 List of prefecture-level divisions of China
 Banner (Inner Mongolia)
 Eight Banner system
 List of administrative divisions of Inner Mongolia
 Aimag

Administrative divisions of China
Geography of Inner Mongolia
China
Articles containing Mongolian script text